Chitralekha is a 1964 Indian Hindi-language historical drama film directed by Kidar Sharma and starring Ashok Kumar, Pradeep Kumar and Meena Kumari. It was based on the 1934 Hindi novel of the same name by Bhagwati Charan Verma about Bijgupta serving under the Maurya Empire and the king Chandragupta Maurya (340 BCE – 298 BCE) and his love for the courtesan Chitralekha. The film's music and lyrics were by Roshan and Sahir Ludhianvi, respectively. The film was noted for songs such as "Sansaar Se Bhaage Phirte Ho" and "Man Re Tu Kaahe na dheer dhare" which is a pensive song which conveys the quintessence of life about letting go of the good and bad. In 2010, Outlook India magazine asked 30 Indian leading composers, lyricists and singers to name their all-time favorite Hindi songs. A list of top 20 songs was published and the top of the chart was ‘Man Re Tu kahe na dheer dhare.’"

It was a remake of Chitralekha (1941), also directed by Kidar Sharma, which was the second-highest grossing Indian film of 1941. Unlike the previous version, the 1964 film did not do well at the box office; critics have suggested poor screenwriting and incorrect casting as reasons. It is the first colour feature film of Meena Kumari.

Cast
 Meena Kumari as Chitralekha 
 Ashok Kumar as Yogi Kumargiri
 Pradeep Kumar as Aryaputra Samant Bijgupt
 Mehmood as Brahmachari Shwetant
 Minoo Mumtaz as  Maid
 Zeb Rehman as Brahma
 Achala Sachdev as Gayatri Devi
 Bela Bose as  Devi Mahamaya
 Shobhna Samarth as Yashodhara

Soundtrack
Music was by Roshan and lyrics were by Sahir Ludhianvi.

Track list

See also
 Amrapali (1966)

References

External links
 

Films set in the 3rd century BC
1960s Hindi-language films
1964 films
Indian historical films
Works about the Maurya Empire
Films about courtesans in India
Remakes of Indian films
Films set in ancient India
Films scored by Roshan
Films set in the Maurya Empire
1960s historical films
Films based on Indian novels